The M3 Bradley Cavalry Fighting Vehicle (CFV) is an American tracked armored reconnaissance vehicle manufactured by BAE Systems Land and Armaments (formerly United Defense). A member of the Bradley Fighting Vehicle family, the M3 CFV is used by heavy armored cavalry units in the United States Army.

History
The M3 Bradley CFV is very similar to the M2 Bradley IFV (Infantry Fighting Vehicle) and is fielded with the same two-man 25-mm Bushmaster Cannon turret with a coaxial M240C 7.62-mm machine gun. It only varies from the M2 in a few subtle ways and by role. The M3 is classified as an armored reconnaissance and scout vehicle and does away with the firing ports found in the M2 series. The M3 also carries more TOW missiles as well as more ammunition for its 25-mm and 7.62-mm guns.

The Bradley family as a whole was originally intended to support the M113 Armored Personnel Carrier (APC), but ended up replacing it in U.S. Army service altogether. Today, the Bradley is fielded in conjunction with the M1 Abrams series of main battle tanks and often accompanies infantry squads into combat. In the 1991 Persian Gulf War, Bradleys destroyed more enemy tanks than the M1 Abrams. Only three Bradleys were lost to enemy fire; however, at least 17 were lost to friendly fire. Improvements to the Bradley family have included enhanced identification features, as well as anti-tank missile countermeasures (for first generation wire-guided missiles only) and improved armor protection in the form of ERA.

Replacement
The United States and United Kingdom worked jointly on the Future Scout and Cavalry System/TRACER in the 1990s. The U.S. Army's intended replacement for the M3 Bradley and up-armored Humvee reached the engineering and manufacturing development phase. It reached the engineering and manufacturing development phase before both partners terminated involvement in October 2001 to pursue other more urgent programs: the U.S. Interim Armored Vehicle and UK Future Rapid Effect System.

From 2003 Future Combat Systems (FCS) planned a successor to the M3 Bradley in the XM1201 Reconnaissance and Surveillance Vehicle. That too was canceled when FCS was terminated in 2009.

The U.S. Army intended the Ground Combat Vehicle replace the M2 Bradley and M113 by 2018, while the M3 Bradley could later be replaced by future variants of the GCV. The GCV project was cancelled in 2014.

Design

Concealment
All versions are equipped with two four-barreled M257 Grenade Launchers on the front of the turret for creating defensive smoke screens, chaff, and flares. It is also fitted with an engine smoke-generating system.

Armor
Armor for the hull and turret for all variants is steel, 5083 aluminum, and unique to the turret is 7039 aluminum.

NBC
The M3A1 variant introduced a gas particulate filter system.

Damage control
The M3A1 variant introduced a fire suppression system.

Mobility
The Bradley is highly capable in cross-country open terrain, in accordance with one of the main design objectives of keeping pace with the M1 Abrams. Whereas the M113 would float without much preparation, the Bradley was initially designed to float by deploying a flotation curtain around the vehicle. This caused some drownings due to failures during its first trials. Armor upgrades have negated this capability. The M3 Bradley was originally developed to accommodate a scout motorcycle. The idea was abandoned when it became apparent that the cycle's unprotected fuel tank could be hazardous to crew members.

Variants

M3(A0)
This model is essentially a re-stowed M2 Bradley. The passenger compartment was occupied by two troopers and more ammunition and missiles. Because it did not carry a squad, the firing ports were covered. The M3 retained the three periscopes between the cargo hatch and entry ramp and the periscopes along the left side of the vehicle, while those on the right side were covered over as they would have been inaccessible due to the TOW missile stowage rack.

M3A1
The M3A1 variant introduced a gas particulate filter system for NBC threats. Unlike the M2A1 Bradley, the NBC masks connected to the central filter for all five crewmen, instead of just the driver, gunner, and vehicle commander. This variant also introduced a fire suppression system. The three periscopes on the rear deck were omitted on the M3A1, and replaced by four periscopes in the cargo hatch itself.

M3A2
The M3A2 incorporated enhanced armor upgrades, such as the ability to mount explosive reactive armor, from the M2A2 Bradley.  After live fire testing, seating and ammunition stowage arrangements were also changed, with the observers moved to a bench on the left side of the vehicle and the missile stowage rearranged to enhance safety.  After the Gulf War, other improvements including an eye-safe carbon dioxide laser rangefinder, global positioning system and compass, missile countermeasure device, combat identification system, and thermal viewer for the driver were incorporated into the M3A2-ODS.

M3A3
The M3A3 model of the Bradley uses enhanced information and communication equipment, a central processing unit, and information displays for the vehicle commander and squad leader. The M3A3 is compatible with the inter-vehicular communication system of the M1A2 Abrams tank and AH-64D Apache Longbow helicopter. The commander has an independent thermal viewer and a new integrated sight unit called the Improved Bradley Acquisition System (IBAS), which allows automatic gun adjustments, automatic boresighting, and tracking of dual targets. The roof is reinforced with titanium armor. Many M3A3s were converted from M3A2s.

M3A4
The M3A4 model of the Bradley is fitted with a new  engine. Electronic systems have been improved. Deliveries of upgraded vehicles commenced in 2020.

Table of variants

References

Sources

External links
 www.fas.org

Cold War armored fighting vehicles of the United States
Tracked reconnaissance vehicles
Tracked infantry fighting vehicles
Military vehicles introduced in the 1980s
BAE Systems land vehicles
Reconnaissance vehicles of the United States
Reconnaissance vehicles of the Cold War
United Defense